Remopleurides is an extinct genus of trilobites.

References

External links
Remopleurides at the Paleobiology Database

Remopleurididae
Asaphida genera
Ordovician trilobites of North America
Ordovician trilobites of Asia
Ordovician trilobites of Europe
Bromide Formation
Paleozoic life of Newfoundland and Labrador
Paleozoic life of the Northwest Territories
Paleozoic life of Nunavut
Paleozoic life of Quebec